Verdayne Smith (born 30 September 1977) is a Jamaican cricket umpire. He has stood in matches in the 2016–17 Regional Four Day Competition and the 2016–17 Regional Super50.

References

1977 births
Living people
Jamaican cricket umpires
People from Manchester Parish